Dağdeviren is a Turkish word, and it may refer to:

People
Canan Dağdeviren (born 1985), Turkish female materials scientist and academic

Places
Dağdeviren, Gerger, a village in Gerger district of Adıyaman Province, Turkey